Semipermeable membrane is  a type of biological or synthetic, polymeric membrane that will allow certain molecules or ions to pass through it by osmosis. The rate of passage depends on the pressure, concentration, and temperature of the molecules or solutes on either side, as well as the permeability of the membrane to each solute. Depending on the membrane and the solute, permeability may depend on solute size, solubility, properties, or chemistry. How the membrane is constructed to be selective in its permeability will determine the rate and the permeability. Many natural and synthetic materials which are rather thick are also semipermeable. One example of this is the thin film on the inside of the egg.

Biological membranes are selectively permeable, with the passage of molecules controlled by facilitated diffusion, passive transport or active transport regulated by proteins embedded in the membrane.

Biological membranes
An example of a biological semi-permeable membrane is the lipid bilayer, on which is based the plasma membrane that surrounds all biological cells. A group of phospholipids (consisting of a phosphate head and two fatty acid tails) arranged into a double layer, the phospholipid bilayer is a semipermeable membrane that is very specific in its permeability.  The hydrophilic phosphate heads are in the outside layer and exposed to the water content outside and within the cell.  The hydrophobic tails are the layer hidden in the inside of the membrane. The phospholipid bilayer is most permeable to small, uncharged solutes. Protein channels are embedded in or through phospholipids, and, collectively, this model is known as the fluid mosaic model. Aquaporins are protein channel pores permeable to water.

Cellular communication
Information can also pass through the plasma membrane when signaling molecules bind to receptors in the cell membrane. The signaling molecules bind to the receptors, which alters the structure of these proteins. A change in the protein structure initiates a signalling cascade; 

The G protein-coupled receptor signalling provides is an important subset of such signalling processes.

Reverse osmosis
The bulk flow of water through a selectively permeable membrane because of an osmotic pressure difference is called osmosis. This allows only certain particles to go through including water and leaving behind the solutes including salt and other contaminants. In the process of reverse osmosis, water is purified by applying high pressure to a solution and thereby push water through a thin-film composite membrane (TFC or TFM). These are semipermeable membranes manufactured principally for use in water purification or desalination systems. They also have use in chemical applications such as batteries and fuel cells. In essence, a TFC material is a molecular sieve constructed in the form of a film from two or more layered materials. Sidney Loeb and Srinivasa Sourirajan invented the first  practical synthetic semi-permeable membrane. Membranes used in reverse osmosis are, in general, made out of polyamide, chosen primarily for its permeability to water and relative impermeability to various dissolved impurities including salt ions and other small molecules that cannot be filtered. Another example of a semipermeable membrane is dialysis tubing.

Other types
Other types of semipermeable membranes are cation-exchange membranes (CEMs), anion-exchange membranes (AEMs), alkali anion exchange membranes (AAEMs) and proton-exchange membranes (PEMs).

References

Further reading
  See this document for definitions of penetrant (permeant), synthetic (artificial) membrane, and anion-exchange membrane.

External links
 The European Membrane House, a non-profit international association created to continue the work of the network and parternships developed in NanoMemPro, an earlier EU-funded European network of membrane researchers.
 Short, non-scholarly WiseGeek article, "What is a Semipermeable Membrane.

Diffusion
Filters
Membrane biology
Membrane technology